Werner Novak (born 31 July 1951 in Hersfeld-Rotenburg) is a former professional German footballer.

Novak made four appearances in the Bundesliga for Tennis Borussia Berlin during his playing career. His career was short-lived because he was injured in a friendly match against Everton due to a challenge by Bob Latchford, which caused Novak to end his footballing career.

References

External links 
 

1951 births
Living people
People from Hersfeld-Rotenburg
Sportspeople from Kassel (region)
German footballers
Footballers from Hesse
Association football defenders
Bundesliga players
2. Bundesliga players
KSV Hessen Kassel players
Tennis Borussia Berlin players